USS Carib is a name used more than once by the U.S. Navy:

  was a cargo ship built in 1916 by Detroit Shipbuilding Co., Detroit, Michigan.
  was launched 7 February 1943 by Charleston Shipbuilding and Dry Dock Co., Charleston, South Carolina.

References 
 

United States Navy ship names